Mike Domitrz is an American educator, author, publisher and the founder of Center for Respect (formerly Date Safe Project), an organization with a mission to prevent sexual assaults and encourage safe dating.

Career
Domitrz started his career as an educator in the field of sexual assault awareness in 1991 after his older sister became a victim of a sexual assault in 1989. Domitrz started campaigning towards prevention of such mishaps, interviewed experts and by 2003 he founded the organization, The Center for Respect (formerly Date Safe Project). The organization helps sexual assault survivors cope with their trauma as well as arranges and gives presentations at schools and military institutions to prevent the issue all together from occurring in the society. The program focuses on a consent through asking first, bystander intervention, and supporting survivors.

As a part of his campaign with the project, Domitrz has gotten teenagers, school students, college & university students, and military personnel to partake in his campaign to help them understand importance of such issues.

Domitrz started the campaign as a formal one, in 1991, as a dedicated seminar titled "Can I Kiss you?" that focused on getting the participants to focus on clear communication via asking first as opposed to mind reading. Domitrz received in-depth media attention, interviews and coverage once his seminar and campaign became a part of the larger project which helped deliver his message worldwide.

References

20th-century American writers
21st-century American writers
American activists
American educators
Living people
Year of birth missing (living people)
20th-century American male writers